Chrysocercops argentata is a moth of the family Gracillariidae. It is known from Pahang, Malaysia and from Nepal.

The wingspan is 6.1–6.8 mm.

The larvae feed on Hopea nutans and Shorea robusta. They mine the leaves of their host plant.

References

Chrysocercops
Moths described in 1992